Poshtir (also Romanized as Poshtīr; also known as Poshttīr, Pushtir, and Pushtyr’) is a village in Gurab Zarmikh Rural District, Mirza Kuchek Janghli District, Sowme'eh Sara County, Gilan Province, Iran. At the 2006 census, its population was 2,190, in 568 families.

References 

Populated places in Sowme'eh Sara County